Leo Sarkisian (January 4, 1921 – June 8, 2018) was an American ethnomusicologist and broadcaster for Voice of America radio. He is known for his work to showcase African music through the Music Time in Africa radio program.

Sarkisian was offered a job with Voice of America by broadcaster Edward R. Murrow in 1961, while in Conakry. At the time, Murrow was the head of the United States Information Agency (USIA) and he heard about Sarkisian through his West African recording trips. Sarkisian accepted the offer and started working for Voice of America in Monrovia, Liberia. Two years later, in 1965, Leo launched Music Time in Africa, a "weekly program that features traditional and contemporary music from all of Africa."

Sarkisian retired from VOA in 2012, at age 91. In 2014, Sarkisian donated his extensive collection of African music to the University of Michigan.

References

External links
  (NOTE: This is the official site of "Music Time in Africa," the show created and hosted by Leo Sarkisian for many years. Now in its sixth decade, it is currently hosted by ethnomusicologist Heather Maxwell.)

1921 births
2018 deaths
American radio personalities
American ethnomusicologists
American people of Armenian descent
University of Michigan people
American expatriates in Liberia
American expatriates in Guinea